Carpathia Seamount, also known as Carpathia Knoll, is an undersea mountain in the North Atlantic Ocean, located about  southeast of Cape Race in Canadian waters off Atlantic Canada.

Carpathia Seamount is one of the seven named Fogo Seamounts. Its name is derived from the British steamship RMS Carpathia, which was the first on the scene after the RMS Titanic collided with an iceberg. The Carpathia rescued passengers of the Titanic following her sinking.

References

External links

Fogo Seamounts